Manuha Temple is a Buddhist temple built in Myinkaba (located near Bagan), by captive Mon King Manuha in 1067, according to King Manuha's inscriptions. It is a rectangular building of two storeys. The building contains three images of seated Buddhas and an image of Lord Buddha entering Final Nibbana. Manuha Temple is one of the oldest temples in Bagan.

About the same time Makuta, captive king of the Thaton Kingdom (his name is now corrupted into 'Manuha'), must have built his colossal images at Myinpagan, where he was living in captivity, a mile S. of Pagan. "Stricken with remorse", says the Glass Palace Chronicle, "he built a colossal Buddha with legs crossed, and a dying Buddha as it were making pariniruâna; and he prayed saying 'Whithersoever I migrate in samsâra, may I never be conquered by another!' The temple is called Manuha to this day.

Gallery

References

Buddhist temples in Myanmar
11th-century Buddhist temples
Bagan
Buddhist pilgrimage sites in Myanmar